LIU Global (formerly: Friends World College, Friends World Institute, Friends World Program, and Global College of Long Island University) is one of Long Island University's schools that offers a four-year Global Studies degree program that sends students abroad to Latin America, Europe, Asia and/or Austral-asia.

Academic

LIU Global offers only one degree, a B.A. in Global Studies. Students from other LIU campuses and other universities can study abroad for a semester or year in one of LIU Global's centers.

All  freshmen are required to travel to the Costa Rica Center, based in Heredia, Costa Rica. In their second year, students study in the Europe Program which is based in Alcalá, Spain in the fall, with field trips to London and Berlin or Morroco and Andalusia, Spain. The Europe program is based in Florence, Italy for the spring semester, with extended field trips to Vienna, Budapest, and Bosnia and Herzegovina. Juniors can choose to spend a year at the China Center in Hangzhou, China which usually includes field trips to Beijing, Shanghai, Yunnan and Sichuan Provinces in Western China; Hong Kong; and Taiwan. They may also choose to travel with the Asia-Pacific Australia Program to Fiji, Australia, and New Zealand in the fall and Australia and Bali in the spring. Students spend their year doing an International Research and Internship Semester (IRIS), a research project centered around an internship in the location and on the topic of the student's choice. The last semester is spent at LIU Brooklyn in New York City, where students complete a series of capstone experiences, a second senior-year internship, and a senior thesis.

History
LIU Global was founded in 1965 as Friends World College through an initiative of New York Yearly Meeting of the Religious Society of Friends (Quakers). Originally conceived as an international Quaker seminary, FWC's first campus was located on an abandoned airport, Mitchel Field, near Hempstead, NY, where the College's programs occupied unused barracks and hangars. In the early 1970s, the College acquired the Livingston estate in Lloyd Harbor, New York through a bequest, and by 1972, it had relocated its North American center there, and in accordance with its vision for international education, had established satellite campuses in England, Kenya, India, Guatemala and Japan. Later, it established campuses in Costa Rica, Israel, and China.

In order that its students might qualify for federally-guaranteed student loans and other Federal programs, the College dropped its formal Quaker affiliation in the mid-1970s and became nominally non-sectarian. However, the President at that time, Dr. George Watson, had already established a Quaker meeting on campus, and this remained until shortly before the College merged with Long Island University.

By the mid- to late-1980s, the College had encountered financial difficulties, and the sudden failure of its Israel program, plus the loss of a US student to malaria in Kenya, helped bring about the Trustees' decision to accept an offer for merger from LIU. The Lloyd Harbor campus was sold to provide a much-needed cash influx, and the school was renamed Friends World Program.  The North American campus was moved to LIU's Southampton College.
during the 1991–1992 academic year.

In the Fall of 2005, the program moved to LIU's Brooklyn Campus, after the campus was sold to Stony Brook University; thus the New York City Center was established. During this period 
"Friends" was dropped, and the College became known as Global Studies LIU. In March 2007, the name Global College was adopted.

In January 2012, LIU launched an institution-wide rebranding campaign, and Global College became LIU Global. Around 70-90 students are currently enrolled at their centers and program sites worldwide.

Currently operating centers
 New York Center, Brooklyn, New York
 Costa Rica Center, Heredia City, Costa Rica
 China Center, Hangzhou, China

Currently operating programs
 Asia-Pacific Australia Program, Byron Bay, Australia
 Europe Program, Spain, London, Berlin, Italy, Vienna, Budapest, Bosnia and Herzegovina

Suspended centers
Regional centers are sometimes shut down indefinitely due to lack of funds, lack of demand, or security or health risks. As of July 2017, these included:
 West Africa Center, Kumasi, Ghana
 East Africa Center, Machakos, Kenya
 European Center, London, England
 Middle East Center, Jerusalem, Israel
 Japan Center, Kyoto, Japan
 Global Issues in South America, various sites in Peru and Ecuador
 South Africa Center, Durban, South Africa
 Comparative Religion and Culture Program, India, Turkey, Thailand, and Taiwan
 India Center, Bangalore, India

Photos

Notable alumni 

 Marla Ruzicka, class of 1999, an activist and aid worker who founded the Center for Civilians in Conflict
 Paloma Criollo, Class of 2015
 During her LIU Global journey, Paloma Criollo G’15 documented the rich, colorful, and passionate experiences through the lens of her camera. Beginning in Costa Rica, she conducted an independent study in sustainable technologies, traveling across the mountainous terrain of the country to farms, villages, and power plants. She explored the comparative religions of Taiwan, Thailand, Turkey, and India, where she studied the Indian art of Banethi and learned how to capture the movement of fire through a lens. In China, Criollo learned Mandarin and interned at Social Entrepreneurial Institute, an incubator for nonprofit and NGOs in Shanghai, as well as Dragon Studios, a production company in Hangzhou. Here she also developed a passion for the relationship between the environment and visual arts, participating in an International Youth Environmental Conference.
 Criollo conducted her Senior Independent Study in Limpopo, South Africa, where she produced a documentary while interning at the Global White Lion Protection Trust. “I worked alongside the local Shangaan Peoples of the Timbavati learning the ancestral knowledge, and assisted anthropologists and scientists working towards sustainability,” she said. “I will never forget the nights we would all sit by the fire after a long day’s work, under the stars in the middle of the bush, surrounded by zebras, wildebeest, impalas, and white lions. From the ecologist's theories to Shangaan elders stories, we all were listening and absorbing the profound knowledge and importance.”
Andrew Kang Bartlett (he/they), Class of 1987
Andrew Kang Bartlett has been working with the Presbyterian Church USA’s Hunger Program since moving to Louisville in 2001. The Presbyterian Hunger Program works nationally and internationally to address the root causes of hunger. Priorities include Food Justice, Worker Justice, Housing Justice, and Environmental Justice. He serves on the boards of the National Farm Worker Ministry, Interfaith Worker Justice, and on the National Coordination of the US Food Sovereignty Alliance. Locally, Andrew volunteers with the Food in Neighborhoods Community Coalition and Louisville Showing Up for Racial Justice.
Andrew graduated from Friends World College in 1984 and earned a Masters in International Relations at San Francisco State University. He has studied in the Dominican Republic, Cuba, Mexico and Central America, and lived for five years in East Asia working with Koreans in Japan on their civil rights struggles. This summer he will celebrate 32 years of marriage with his Korean drums teacher, Haeja Kang. They have two children—Elías (27), a public defense lawyer, and Julian (24), a cook and musician. For fun and to stay sane during the pandemic, he enjoys group reading of Rudolf Steiner, yoga, ecstatic dance, hiking, cycling, and growing sweet potatoes.

External links
 LIU Global website

References

Long Island University
Universities and colleges in Brooklyn
Educational institutions established in 1965
1965 establishments in New York (state)